Maritta Marke (born Asta Margit Svensson; 30 June 1905 – 8 December 1983) was a Swedish film and stage actress. She also sang in operettas. She was married to the actor Leif Amble-Næss in 1938 with whom she had a son Lars Amble. She had previously been married to the conductor Håkan von Eichwald.

Selected filmography
 Tired Theodore (1931)
 A Night of Love by the Öresund (1931)
 Lucky Devils (1932)
 A Stolen Waltz (1932)
 Mother-in-Law's Coming (1932)
 Marriageable Daughters (1933)
 Two Men and a Widow (1933)
 The Marriage Game (1935)
 He, She and the Money (1936)
 Kungen kommer (1936)
 Unfriendly Relations (1936)
 Hotel Paradise (1937)
 Nothing But the Truth (1939)
 June Night (1940)
 Widower Jarl (1945)
 Classmates (1952)
 Rasmus and the Vagabond (1955)
 When the Mills are Running (1956)
 Lend Me Your Wife (1959)
 When Darkness Falls (1960)
 Heart's Desire (1960)
 Woman of Darkness (1966)

References

Bibliography
 Quirk, Lawrence J. Ingrid Bergman. Gremese Editore, 1983.

External links

1905 births
1983 deaths
Swedish film actresses
Swedish stage actresses
20th-century Swedish actresses
People from Sjöbo Municipality